Fire It Up is the fifth studio album by American hip hop group Kottonmouth Kings. It was released on April 20, 2004 via Suburban Noize Records with a bonus DVD titled Down 4 tha Krown which contained interviews, documentary footage, video clips and music videos. Production was handled by Mike Kumagai and member Daddy X, who also served as executive producer together with Kevin Zinger. It features guest appearances from Humble Gods and Casey Royer. The album peaked at number 42 on the Billboard 200 and number 4 on the Independent Albums in the United States.

Track listing

Notes
Track 12 is a cover version of D.I.'s song "Johnny's Got a Problem" from 1986 Horse Bites Dog Cries.

Personnel
Brad "Daddy X" Xavier – vocals, producer, executive producer
Dustin "D-Loc" Miller – vocals
Timothy "Johnny Richter" McNutt – vocals
Daniel "Danny P" Patterson – guitar (tracks: 1, 10, 11, 18)
Doug Carrion – guitar (tracks: 6, 9, 12, 16, 17), bass (tracks: 2, 6, 7, 9, 11, 12, 16, 17, 19, 20, 22)
Paul Ill – bass (tracks: 3, 11, 20, 22)
Brad Gordon – keyboards (tracks: 1, 3, 10, 11, 20, 22)
Tom Brayton – drums (tracks: 3, 11, 20)
Byron McMackin – drums (tracks: 6, 12)
Josh Freese – drums (track 9)
Scott Garrett – drums (tracks: 16, 17, 19, 22)
Mike Kumagai – producer, mixing, engineering
Patrick Shevelin – mixing, engineering
Tom Baker – mastering
Kevin Zinger – executive producer
Dave Leamon – cover
Larry Love – illustration, layout
Scott Harrison – photography

Charts

References

External links

2004 albums
Kottonmouth Kings albums
Suburban Noize Records albums